The 2022 Holy Cross Crusaders football team represents the College of the Holy Cross as a member of the Patriot League during the 2022 NCAA Division I FCS football season. The Crusaders are led by fifth-year head coach Bob Chesney.

Previous season

The Crusaders finished the 2021 season with a record of 10–3, 6–0 Patriot League play to win the Patriot League championship. They received an automatic bid to the FCS Playoffs where they beat Sacred Heart in the first round, before losing to Villanova in the second round.

Schedule

Game summaries

at Merrimack

at Buffalo

Yale

at Colgate

at Harvard

Bucknell

at Lafayette

No. 22 Fordham

Lehigh

Bryant

at Georgetown

FCS Playoffs

No. 15 New Hampshire – Second Round

at No. 1 South Dakota State – Quarterfinals

References

Holy Cross
Holy Cross Crusaders football seasons
Patriot League football champion seasons
Holy Cross
Holy Cross Crusaders football